The 2014 NBA All-Star Game was an exhibition basketball game that was played on February 16, 2014, during the National Basketball Association's (NBA) 2013–14 season. It was the 63rd edition of the NBA All-Star Game, and was played at Smoothie King Center in New Orleans, home of the New Orleans Pelicans. The Eastern Conference defeated the Western Conference, 163–155. Kyrie Irving was named the All-Star Game Most Valuable Player. The game was televised nationally on TNT in the United States, and TSN in Canada.

The Pelicans (the name was changed by new team owner Tom Benson for the 2013–14 season) were awarded the All-Star Game in an announcement by commissioner David Stern on April 16, 2012. It was the second time that New Orleans had hosted the All-Star game; the city had previously hosted the event in 2008, also at the Smoothie King Center (then known as New Orleans Arena).

Starters for the game were selected by the fans, who could select three frontcourt players and two guards for each conference. LeBron James was the leading vote-getter with 1,416,419 votes. Stephen Curry was also voted as a starter in first All-Star selection, after leading all Western Conference guards in the voting, while Kevin Love overtook Dwight Howard for the final frontcourt starting spot for the West.

All-Star Game

Coaches

Frank Vogel, coach of the Indiana Pacers, and Scott Brooks, coach of the Oklahoma City Thunder, were selected as the East and West head coach, respectively.

Roster

 Kobe Bryant was unable to participate due to injury.
 Anthony Davis was named as Kobe Bryant's replacement.
 Scott Brooks chose James Harden to start in place of the injured Kobe Bryant.

Game

Kyrie Irving scored 31 points and had 14 assists and was named the NBA All-Star Game Most Valuable Player (MVP) to help the East stop a three-game losing streak and win 163–155 in the second highest-scoring game in All-Star history. Carmelo Anthony added 30 points for the East and made a record eight three-pointers, one of 11 All-Star records that were broken in the game. The West was led by Kevin Durant and Blake Griffin, who both finished with 38 points, four short of Wilt Chamberlain's All-Star record in 1962.

All-Star Weekend

BBVA Compass Rising Stars Challenge

 Pero Antić was unable to participate due to injury.
 Miles Plumlee was named Pero Antić's replacement.

Sears Shooting Stars Competition

Taco Bell Skill Challenge

Foot Locker Three-Pointer Contest

Sprite Slam Dunk Contest

See also

References

External links

 2014 All-Star Game at NBA.com

2014 NBA All-Star Game
NBA All-Star Game
21st century in New Orleans
Basketball competitions in New Orleans
All-Star
ABS-CBN television specials